Gustavo primo, re di Svezia (Gustavus the First, King of Sweden) is a three act opera seria by Baldassare Galuppi, with a libretto by Carlo Goldoni, fictionalising events in the life of Gustav I of Sweden. Composed in honour of the Genoese nobleman marchese Giovanni Giacomo Grimaldi, it premiered on 25 May 1740 at Venice's Teatro San Samuele. It was first recorded in 2003 by Edit Károly, Mónika Gonzalez, Mario Cecchetti, Gabriella Létai Kiss, Filippo Pina Castiglioni, and the Savaria Baroque Orchestra, conducted by Fabio Pirona.

Premiere cast

Historical context

References

External links

Libretto, carlogoldoni.it

Operas by Baldassare Galuppi
Italian-language operas
Operas
1740 operas
Libretti by Carlo Goldoni
Operas set in the 16th century
16th century in Sweden